Salt River is a river in Canada whose source is McNeil Lake
in Wood Buffalo National Park in northern Alberta. It enters the Slave River north of Fort Smith, Northwest Territories.

The main tributaries are Brine Creek (mouth coordinates ) and Loop Creek (mouth coordinates ).

Salt River settlement
At the mouth of the river is a village known as Salt River. It was settled in the latter part of the 18th century. Francois Beaulieu (1771–1872) was its most notable resident. A Roman Catholic mission was in the village from 1850 until 1876 when it moved to Fort Smith.

Salt deposits were collected from the banks during the fur trade era.

See also
List of rivers of Alberta
List of rivers of the Northwest Territories

References

External links

  The Salt Plains (Wood Buffalo National Park)
 Salt River (Wood Buffalo National Park)

Rivers of Alberta
Rivers of the Northwest Territories